The men's 400 metre freestyle was a swimming event held as part of the swimming at the 1936 Summer Olympics programme. It was the seventh appearance of the event, which was established in 1908. The competition was held from Monday to Wednesday, 10 to 12 August 1936.

Thirty-four swimmers from 16 nations competed.

Medalists

Records
These were the standing world and Olympic records (in minutes) prior to the 1936 Summer Olympics.

In the fifth heat Shunpei Uto set a new Olympic record with 4:45.5 minutes. In the final Jack Medica bettered the Olympic record with 4:44.5 minutes.

Results

Heats

Monday 10 August 1936: The fastest two in each heat and the next two fastest from across the heats advanced to the semi-finals.

Heat 1

Heat 2

Heat 3

Heat 4

Heat 5

Heat 6

Semifinals

Tuesday 11 August 1936: The fastest three in each semi-final and the fastest fourth-placed advanced to the final.

Semifinal 1

Semifinal 2

Final

Wednesday 12 August 1936:

References

External links
Olympic Report
 

Swimming at the 1936 Summer Olympics
Men's events at the 1936 Summer Olympics